Steven Self may also refer to:

Steve Self, hockey player
Stephen Self, volcanologist